Shona Marshall (born 27 June 1964) is a Scottish sport shooter.

Marshall won a silver medal at the 2010 Commonwealth Games in the women's trap singles event. She also competed at the 2006 Commonwealth Games and 2014 Commonwealth Games.

References

1964 births
Living people
Scottish female sport shooters
Shooters at the 2006 Commonwealth Games
Shooters at the 2010 Commonwealth Games
Shooters at the 2014 Commonwealth Games
Commonwealth Games silver medallists for Scotland
Commonwealth Games medallists in shooting
Sportspeople from Aberdeen
British female sport shooters
Medallists at the 2010 Commonwealth Games